Anthony Lawrence Longhurst (born 1 October 1957 in Sydney) is an Australian racing driver and former Australian Champion water skier. He is most noted for his career in the Australian Touring Car Championship and V8 Supercar series.
Longhurst is a two-time winner of the Bathurst 1000, winning the event in 1988 with Tomas Mezera and in 2001 with Mark Skaife, and is one of only five drivers to win Bathurst in both a Ford and a Holden (the others being Craig Lowndes, Steven Richards , Jamie Whincup and Chaz Mostert).

He also had a long association with BMW, racing internationally in the 1987 World Touring Car Championship and 1993 FIA Touring Car Challenge, and winning the 1985 Sandown 500 and the 1994 Australian Super Touring Championship for the marque.

Career

JPS Team BMW

After a self-entered Bathurst 1000 debut in 1983 with Mike Burgmann, Longhurst joined Frank Gardner's JPS Team BMW team for the 1984 Australian Endurance Championship. Co-driving with Jim Richards, Longhurst continued with the team in 1985, winning the 1985 Sandown 500 in a one-two finish for the team. Longhurst also entered three solo rounds of the 1985 Australian Touring Car Championship, finishing third at the Amaroo Park Raceway round on only his second appearance. Longhurst entered the entire 1986 Australian Touring Car Championship, again finishing on the podium at Amaroo, and finishing fifth in the championship. In 1987, Longhurst would finish fourth in the championship with four round podiums. Frank Gardner then shut his team at the end of the 1987 season.

LoGaMo Racing

With the demise of JPS Team BMW, Longhurst started his own touring car team in 1988, which based itself on the Gold Coast behind the Longhurst family owned Dreamworld. Both Gardner and Terry Morris would take a shareholding in the team which became known as LoGaMo Racing. For sponsorship reasons the team was known by various names during its time including Freeport Motorsport and Benson & Hedges Racing.

Initially running the powerful Ford Sierra RS500 from 1988 to 1990, Longhurst won the 1988 Bathurst 1000 driving with Tomas Mezera. The car (pictured right) remains on display at the National Motor Racing Museum, which is located on the outside of the final turn of the famous Mount Panorama Circuit. Longhurst also won his first championship round in 1988 at Amaroo. The team then used the evolution model BMW M3 from 1991 to 1993, and Longhurst finished a career-best third in both 1991 and 1992. In this period, Longhurst saw particular success at Lakeside International Raceway, winning three rounds at the circuit in 1988, 1991 and 1992.

From 1993, the ATCC moved to the Group 3A Touring Car formula based on Ford Falcons and Holden Commodores. LoGaMo continued to run the BMW M3 in 1993 before running a Holden VP Commodore supplied by Perkins Engineering in 1994. In 1994 Longhurst won the first race of the 1994 Barbagallo ATCC round, his final solo race victory in the championship.

Outside the ATCC, Longhurst was the only driver to have won five of the now defunct AMSCAR series run at Sydney's Amaroo Park circuit. He won the series in 1986 (BMW 325i), 1987 (BMW M3), 1989 and 1990 (Ford Sierra RS500) and 1991 (BMW M3 Evolution). Longhurst also saw success in the New Zealand endurance events held for Group A regulations. In 1992 he won the Wellington 500 in the team's BMW M3 and came 3rd in the 1989 event. He also finished 3rd in 1989 and 2nd in 1986 in the Pukekohe 500 event which was held in conjunction with the Wellington event.

Longhurst Racing
In 1995, Longhurst sold out to fellow shareholders Gardner and Morris (who wanted to focus on the Australian Super Touring Championship) and formed Longhurst Racing to compete in the Australian Touring Car Championship with a Ford EF Falcon backed by Castrol. The team's highlight was a podium at the 1996 Bathurst 1000 with Longhurst and Steven Ellery. Despite this, the team experienced limited success and Longhurst sold the team at the end of the 1999 season.

Contracted driver
For 2000, Longhurst was hired to drive for Stone Brothers Racing. Longhurst came close to winning the 2000 Bathurst 1000 with David Besnard, despite making the most pitstops of anyone in the race, until an incident scuppered their chances while leading with ten laps to go. In 2001, Longhurst competed with Rod Nash Racing during the single-driver events before being drafted into the Holden Racing Team for the endurance races. Driving with Mark Skaife, Longhurst won the 2001 Bathurst 1000. 2002 was Longhurst's last full-time season, driving for Briggs Motor Sport.

In 2003, Longhurst only entered the endurance races, pairing with Jim Richards as he had done in the 1980s. He would sign for Perkins Engineering in 2004, but did not see out the full season. In 2005, Longhurst bought the license for Team Dynamik's second car, running the No. 45 car for Max Wilson under WOW Sight & Sound sponsorship. Following Simon Wills's rollover at the Sandown 500, Longhurst purchased the remaining license from Team Dynamik and replaced Wills as Wilson's co-driver for the following round at Bathurst. He announced his retirement from competitive racing after the 2005 Bathurst 1000, where he and Brazilian co-driver Max Wilson failed to finish the race. 

He also made an appearance at the Targa Tasmania in 2005 and 2006, finishing fourth overall in the latter.

Retirement and comebacks
Despite his retirement announcement, Longhurst made two subsequent returns to the V8 Supercar Championship Series. In 2006, he was co-driver for Steve Owen in the Rod Nash Racing AutoBarn Commodore. The pair put in solid drives finishing 12th at Sandown and 7th at Bathurst. Longhurst's final drive came at the 2007 Sandown 500 where he paired with Glenn Seton following a series of last minute driver swaps in the Holden Racing Team following Mark Skaife having surgery to remove his appendix.

In 2009 he added a Bathurst 12 Hour victory, co-driving with Rod Salmon and Damien White. By winning the 12 Hour, Longhurst joined Allan Grice, Gregg Hansford, Dick Johnson and John Bowe as the only winners of both the Bathurst 1000 and Bathurst 12 Hour races at the time of his achievement.
In 2016, Longhurst returned to competition making an appearance at the Sydney Motorsport Park round of the Australian GT Championship in a MARC Ford Focus and at the Silverstone Classic driving his 1994 Australian Manufacturers' Championship winning BMW 318i Super Touring car.

Longhurst returned to Bathurst for the first time since winning the 2009 WPS Bathurst 12 Hour when he contested the 2017 Liqui Moly Bathurst 12 Hour driving a BMW M6 GT3 for BMW Team SRM alongside Timo Glock, Mark Skaife and Russell Ingall. The entry did not finish. Longhurst again entered the 2018 Liqui Moly Bathurst 12 Hour in a GT4 BMW and won his class with Aaron Seton and Matthew Brabham. After this result, Longhurst again called time on his career.

Other activities
Longhurst continues to live on the Gold Coast in Queensland and owns and manages the Boat Works facility at Coomera.
Before entering motorsport, Longhurst was successful in water skiing, holding the Australian speed record.

Career results
Sourced from Driver Database

Complete World Sportscar Championship results
(key) (Races in bold indicate pole position) (Races in italics indicate fastest lap)

Complete World Touring Car Championship results
(key) (Races in bold indicate pole position) (Races in italics indicate fastest lap)

† Not registered for series & points

Complete Bathurst 1000 results

Complete Sandown Endurance results

Complete Bathurst 12 Hour results

References

1957 births
Australian Touring Car Championship drivers
Bathurst 1000 winners
Living people
Sportspeople from the Gold Coast, Queensland
Racing drivers from Sydney
Supercars Championship drivers
World Sportscar Championship drivers
Australian Endurance Championship drivers
BMW M drivers
Stone Brothers Racing drivers